{{Infobox radio station
| name             = KDDB
| logo             = 
| city             = Waipahu, Hawaii
| area             = Honolulu, Hawaii
| branding         = 102.7 Da Bomb
| frequency        = 102.7 MHz
| translator       =
| airdate          = 1990
| format           = Top 40 (CHR)
| erp              = 61,000 watts horizontal polarization60,000 watts vertical
| haat             = 
| class            = C
| facility_id      = 38244
| coordinates      = 
| callsign_meaning = K D Da Bomb (Slang for "It's The Bomb!", meaning great or awesome)
| former_callsigns = KDEO (1990–1998)  KKHN (1998–2000)
| affiliations     = 
| owner            = Pacific Radio Group, Inc.
| licensee         = 
| sister_stations  = KPOI-FM, KQMQ-FM, KUMU-FM
| webcast          = Listen Live
| website          = 1027dabomb.net 
}}KDDB (102.7 FM) 102.7 Da Bomb is a commercial radio station licensed to Waipahu, Hawaii, and serving the Honolulu radio market. The Pacific Media Group station is known as "102.7 Da Bomb". It broadcasts a top 40 (mainstream CHR) format.  KDDB also transmits on Oceanic Spectrum digital channel 854 for the entire state of Hawaii.  The studios and offices are on Bishop Street in Honolulu.

KDDB has an effective radiated power (ERP) of 61,000 watts, horizontal polarization and 60,000 watts vertical.  The transmitter is located off Palehua Road in Akupu.

History

Debut
The station debuted in 1990 as country outlet KDEO.

Radio Free Hawaii
In 1991, the station flipped to an eclectic freeform format as "Radio Free Hawaii", which proved to be popular with listeners, who voted via ballot boxes in various locations across O'ahu and Maui and via their website. These votes were compiled into the Hawaiian Island Music Report (Hawaiian Island Charts).

When the owner of KDEO entered into an operating agreement with KRTR-FM in November 1994, citing financial troubles, the format was changed to classic rock as "The Blaze". The Blaze proved unpopular, and the station returned to Radio Free Hawaii by May 1995.

Despite the popularity of the voting-based format, Radio Free Hawaii had trouble generating revenue. The station's manager, "Sheriff" Norm Winter, stated in an interview years later that this was due to his refusal to subscribe to the Arbitron ratings system, as the fee to subscribe was $50,000 at the time. Advertisers at the time relied mainly on the Arbitron ratings to buy airtime, and were not impressed by Winters' own in-house research showing that the station was in the top 3 stations in Oahu listenership. As a result, the station went deeper and deeper into debt.

The station, under Winter's leadership, was instrumental in starting the first annual rock festival in Hawaii, the Big Mele.

Cool 102.7/Double K Country
On March 7, 1997, the station was acquired by Caribou Broadcasting; new owners dropped the Radio Free format for Adult R&B as "Cool 102.7" KHUL. However, it didn't attract listeners or ratings, and in 1998 it returned to country as KKHN, "Double K Country".

102.7 Da Bomb

On November 17, 2000, at 3:00p.m. that format went away (again) when the owners moved KQMQ-FM's Rhythmic Top 40 format to the frequency. After stunting with a loop of The Gap Band's You Dropped a Bomb on Me, it then relaunched as "102.7 Da Bomb", with the first song being "What's Your Fantasy" by Ludacris. In late 2000, the calls were changed to KDDB'''. At first, KDDB, like most other Rhythmic start-ups, had featured Hip-Hop as a core component of the playlist, only to scale back on the genre after KIKI and KQMQ both flipped formats, along with the changing taste in its listeners and embracing other musical genres, including the EDM culture (KIKI would return to Rhythmic as KUBT in September 2016). Although their slogan boast "All The Hits Now!," the station's playlist features a broad-based direction with a unique blend of current Rhythmic Pop/Dance hits.

In July 2018, the station transitioned to a Top 40/CHR presentation with the inclusion of Pop-centric product and to become more competitive with KPHW, who also shifted to Top 40/CHR, giving Honolulu two outlets with Top 40/CHRs, ending a five-year drought in Honolulu and return to having two Mainstream CHRs for the first time since 1997. The station is now owned by Ohana Broadcast Company and programmed by Kelsey "K-Smooth" Yogi.

Pacific Media Group acquired the Ohana Broadcasting cluster effective September 1, 2019, bringing its station total across Hawai'i to 20 and giving it its first stations on O'ahu.

In the media
In a December 1983 episode of Magnum, P.I.'' titled "The Look", the 102.7 MHz frequency was used as the home of the fictitious KTDE, "K-Tide". The plot revolved around a female disc jockey at that radio station. In reality, the 102.7 MHz frequency was dark at that time, as were all FM frequencies above 97.5 MHz (KPOI, now KHCM-FM).

References

External links
 
 

DDB
Contemporary hit radio stations in the United States
Radio stations established in 1990
1990 establishments in Hawaii
Waipahu, Hawaii